Robert Colquhoun (20 December 1914 – 20 September 1962) was a Scottish painter, printmaker and theatre set designer.

Colquhoun was born in Kilmarnock and was educated at Kilmarnock Academy. He won a scholarship to study at the Glasgow School of Art, where he met Robert MacBryde with whom he established a lifelong homosexual relationship and professional collaboration, the pair becoming known as "the two Roberts".

He joined MacBryde on a travelling scholarship to France and Italy from 1937 to 1939, before serving as an ambulance driver in the Royal Army Medical Corps during the Second World War. After being injured, he returned to London in 1941 where he shared studio space with MacBryde. The pair shared a house with John Minton and, from 1943, Jankel Adler.

Colquhoun's early works of agricultural labourers and workmen were strongly influenced by the colours and light of rural Ayrshire. His work developed into a more austere, Expressionist style, heavily influenced by Picasso, and concentrated on the theme of the isolated, agonised figure. From the mid-1940s to the early 1950s he was considered one of the leading artists of his generation. Along with that of MacBryde, the work of Colquhoun was regularly shown at the Lefevre Gallery in London.

At the height of their acclaim they courted a large circle of friends - including Michael Ayrton, Francis Bacon, Lucian Freud and John Minton as well as the writers Fred Urquhart, George Barker, Elizabeth Smart and Dylan Thomas - and were renowned for their parties at their studio (77 Bedford Gardens). Colquhoun was also a prolific printmaker, producing a large number of lithographs and monotypes throughout his career.

During and after the Second World War he worked with MacBryde on several set designs. These included sets for Gielgud's Macbeth, King Lear at Stratford and Massine's Scottish ballet Donald of the Burthens, produced by the Sadler's Wells Ballet at Covent Garden in 1951. During the 1950s their artistic reputation went into serious decline, and their heavy drinking made any serious effort to paint impossible. According to their friend Anthony Cronin they were often close to destitution.

In May 1958, his work was shown in a solo exhibition at the Whitechapel Gallery in London, England.

Robert Colquhoun died, an alcoholic, in relative obscurity in London in 1962. MacBryde moved to Dublin, where he was killed in a traffic accident in 1966. Their friend Anthony Cronin describes them with respect and affection in his memoir Dead as Doornails.

Works
 Mysterious Figures (1960)
 Woman with Leaping Cat (1945)

References

External links and further reading
 
 
 Brown, Andrew (1981), Spiritual and Temporal Hazards: The Art of Robert Colquhoun, in Murray, Glen (ed.) Cencrastus No. 6, Autumn 1981, pp. 14 – 17
 Elliot, Patrick (2017), Robert Colquhoun 1914 - 1962 in Strang, Alice (ed.) (2017), A New Era: Scottish Modern Art 1900 - 1950, National Galleries of Scotland, pp. 38 & 39, 
 Biography at the Tate Gallery
 Robert Colquhoun on the Gazetteer for Scotland
 The Roberts at the Scottish National Gallery (exhibition catalogue)

1914 births
1962 deaths
People from Kilmarnock
20th-century Scottish painters
Scottish male painters
Modern painters
Expressionist painters
Scottish scenic designers
Scottish printmakers
Alumni of the Glasgow School of Art
Scottish soldiers
British Army personnel of World War II
Royal Army Medical Corps soldiers
People educated at Kilmarnock Academy
Scottish LGBT painters
Alumni of Hospitalfield House
20th-century British printmakers
20th-century Scottish LGBT people
20th-century Scottish male artists